Duncan Kinney (born 1982 or 1983) is an Edmonton-based Canadian journalist and activist. He is the founder and executive director of Progress Alberta and the editor of The Progress Report.

Early life and education 
Kinney grew up in Calgary, Alberta, and has a bachelor's degree in communications and journalism from Mount Royal University.

Career 
Kinney founded Progress Alberta in 2016, and works as the organizations executive director. He is also the editor of the left-wing media outlet The Progress Report. At The Progress Report, Kinney oversees a newsletter, a podcast, and investigative reporting.

Activism, views, allegations 
In 2015, Kinney called upon the Alberta government to meet its promise to reduce methane output by 45% by 2025. In June 2021, Kinney satirically ran for the Senate of Canada, despite being a senate abolitionist.

Kinney is a long-time critic of Edmonton Police Service, having criticised their budget, their use of armoured vehicles and their actions removing homeless camps. In March 2022, the police revoked Kinney's press credentials.

On October 14, 2022, Kinney was charged with mischief and appeared in court on November 10, 2022 in relation to allegations that vandalised the Roman Shukhevych statue in Edmonton. Kinney is accused of spray painting “Nazi monument” and “14th Waffen SS” on the statue outside the Edmonton’s Ukrainian Youth Unity Complex during August 2021. Kinney had previously reported on the vandalism, which he wrote was undertaken by an "unknown person or persons".

Personal life 
Kinney moved from Calgary to Edmonton around 2009. He was aged 39 in 2022.

See also 

 List of Nazi monuments in Canada
 14th Waffen Grenadier Division of the SS (1st Galician)
 Ukrainian collaboration with Nazi Germany
 Politics of Alberta

References

External links 

 Progress Alberta - official website
 The Progress Report - official website
 Edmonton's Nazi collaborator statue, Progress Alberta, 30 October 2019.
 Duncan Kinney on Twitter

Living people
1980s births
Journalists from Alberta
Organization founders
Canadian newspaper editors
Mount Royal University alumni